The Crested Butte Film Festival is a celebration of international films, held annually over four days in the last weekend of September, in Crested Butte, Colorado.

History
Michael and Jennifer Brody established the Crested Butte Film Festival in 2011, looking for creative work together following careers in filmmaking and education. The first installment of the Crested Butte Film Festival had an audience of 1,500 or about the population of the town; two years later attendance doubled. The festival is held just as the aspens turn into their imperial gold.

Program
Crested Butte Film Festival programs artful, moving, creative and provocative films. Preference is given to creativity, daring, great storytelling, and bravery. The top selections are awarded to ACTNow, to the best narrative and documentary features, best documentary short, children's films, and to those chosen by the audience.

Awards

Action and Change Together (ACTNow)
Awarded to a nonprofit organization linked to a call-to-action documentary.

Juried Awards

Audience Choice

Other awards

Special Jury Prize
 2012 – Alexander Gaeta, "Outstanding achievement, directorial debut"; Shoot the Moon
 2014 – Martin Rath, "Outstanding achievement, breakthrough filmmaker"; Written in Ink and Arena
 2015 – Yana Novikova (Яна Новикова), "Outstanding achievement, debut performance in a feature film"; The Tribe (Плем'я)
 2016 – Leonor Caraballo, Mattero Norzi, Abou Farman, and Adella Ladjevardi, "Artistic accomplishment"; Icaros: A Vision
 2016 – Ashley Valenzuela, "Filmmaker to watch"; Warm Waves
 2017 – David Byars, "Excellence in filmmaking"; No Man's Land
 2017 – Nancy Liu, "Filmmaker to watch"; Angeltown
 2017 – Dana Romanoff, "Embodying the spirit of activism in the arts"; Storytelling and the Spirit of Activism in Cinema
 2019 – Nancy Dionne, "Achievement in social impact and activism"; All I See is the Future
 2019 – Zack Gottsagen, "Outstanding debut performance"
 2020 – Mohammad Rasoulof, "Courage in filmmaking"
 2020 – Ashley Williams, "Outstanding achievement, directorial debut"

Spirit of the Festival
 2013 – Jack Hanley
 2014 – Scott Aigner and Marcelo Mitnik
 2015 – Jennifer Brody
 2016 – Jeramiah Friesen
 2017 – Stacey Donaldson and Kat Cooke

See also 
 List of film festivals

References

External links 
 Official site of the CBFF
 CBFF page at IMDb

Film festivals in Colorado